The Mahameed, and sometimes the Mahmid or the Mahammeed, are an Arab tribe that traces its origins to the Khawlaniyah al-Qahtaniyah Harb The majority of them resided originally in the Hijaz, between Mecca and Medina, and then spread in the Arabian Peninsula and the countries of the Maghreb, which are considered among the Arab tribes spread throughout the Arab countries.

Tribe lineage 
The Mahameed, the sons of Mahmoud bin Talha bin Maymun bin al-Musafir bin Amr bin Ziyad bin Sulaiman bin Salem bin Harb bin Saad bin Khawlan bin Amr bin Al-Haf bin Qadda bin Malik bin Amr bin Marra bin Zaid bin Malik bin Hamir bin Saba bin Ya'roub bin Qahtan

Tribe biography 

Their biography is repeated in the frequent travels, emigration and instability during their travels from their homes by origin, and their biography indicates that when the tribe enlarged and narrowed their area of residence in Najd and Hijaz, they gathered to take opinions about what they need to do, and some of them said we conquer the tribes, and this suggestion was rejected because most of those in the neighborhood Among them were clans and sub-clans from the Harb tribe, and from them all five gathered together, i.e. those who were united by the fifth grandfather and suggested leaving and settled their opinion on him.

And the last thing known of their cousins is that they went to the Dumat Al-Jandal area in the north, settled there for a period of time, and then moved towards the Levant.

They moved until they reached the Karak region and settled in it, and they were of such a large number that they outnumbered the largest tribes in the region, and they allied themselves with some of the Karak clans and the most prominent of them were Al-Omaro Bani Uqba. They established an emirate called (Emirate of Mahamid) for the majority of them from the Al-Amru clan at that time and their rule lasted for a long time, and some of the Orientalists narrated and historians have wronged those under their rule as they were cruel to them, which prompted this different clans to unite against them.

Tribe spread 
The Arabian Peninsula:

Saudi Arabia

The tribe is divided into several branches, and they are:
 alrtuei
 almatiei
 almadhakir
 almuhabida
 alrathea

Kuwait

The Levant and Iraq:

Syria

Branched out from them:

 The Hourani  

Jordan

Branched out from them:

 Al Abdul Dayem
 Al-Shaleikh
 Al-Bahri
 Ayal Abdo
 The Abu Karaki family (the Mahamid who came from Daraa, immigrated from them to Umm al-Fahm, after which to the Karak governorate)
 The Mahameed alliance with Al-Huwaitat.
 The Mahameed alliance with Bani Abbad.
 The Mahameed alliance with Bani Hamida
 The Mahameed alliance with Zoubi
Palstine

Branched out from them:

 kiawan 
 alkhudur 
 alsawalima 
 alhamamada 
 almusaeada 
 alhasasana 
 aljeayisa 
 dar alearabi
 al'asead 
 al'ahmad

Iraq

Arab Africa

They migrated with their allies Banu Selim from the Hijaz to Africa

Branched out from them:

 alsabea 
 'awlad sula 
 'awlad almarmurii 
 'awlad shabl

References 

Tribes of Arabia
Tribes of Saudi Arabia
Tribes of the United Arab Emirates
Tribes of Iraq
Tribes of Jordan
Tribes of Syria